The Cephalelini is a tribe of leafhoppers containing several genera found in South Africa, Australia and New Zealand. Most species associate with plants from the Restionaceae family. The South African Cephalelini are commonly known as restio leafhoppers.

References

Hemiptera tribes
Ulopinae